Elena Blasco (born 1950) is a Spanish multidisciplinary artist who works in photography, painting, and installations. With a subjective and ironic view, she recreates everyday objects and settings to build a personal and unique identity into her works, in some cases referring to gender violence and social injustice.

Career
Elena Blasco earned a licentiate from the Complutense University of Madrid's Faculty of Fine Arts in 1974, opting to specialize in painting. She graduated in Photography and Decoration from the Madrid School of Plastic Arts.

She held her first exhibition in 1976, during a decade in which conceptual experiences mingled with political attitudes, along with the so-called "new Madrid figuration" that claimed a return to painting and its expressive and conceptual potential.

In the 1990s her work began to gain popularity and was acquired by collections and museums.

Blasco's artistic style amalgamates very diverse works where the interplay of colors and techniques is characterized, combining photography, painting, and installations. However, despite the casual and lively atmosphere that is created around her productions, the aim and background of her works are paradoxically radical in terms of the meanings she projects, questioning canonical prejudices of today's society. Several of her works incorporate debates about gender.

Blasco has been a teacher at the  since 2002, and is a member of the Association of Women in the Visual Arts (MAV).

Individual exhibitions
 1976: "En el estudio. Estandartes y collages I". Outdoor assemblage, Madrid.
 1979: "En el estudio. Los americanos II". Outdoor assemblage. Madrid.
 1983: Ateneo de Málaga, Málaga. - 1982 "La evolución de las especies de cuadros". Galería Montenegro, Madrid. - 1982 Galería Almuzara, Segovia.
 1986: "Todo se me hace poco para ti". Galería Angel Romero, Madrid.
 1989: Galería Angel Romero, Madrid.
 1991: "Al deseo lo meneo". Galería Angel Romero, Madrid. "La desproporción". Galería Estampa, Madrid. Galerie Snoëi, Rotterdam (Holanda).Galería Berini, Barcelona.
 1992: Gemeentemuseum Arhem, Arhem (Países Bajos)
 1993: Galería Rafael Ortiz, Seville.
 1994: "No os asustéis, ya estoy aquí yo". Galería Angel Romero, Madrid; Galería Mácula, Alicante; Galería Berini, Barcelona.
 1995: Galería Vanguardia, Bilbao.
 1996: "¿Por qué disimuláis?, cualquiera reconoce una flecha". Galería Siboney, Santander.
 1997: "Búfalos son Búfalos". Galería Angel Romero, Madrid.
 1998: "Sólo quiero no extrañar el cielo". Galería Trinta. Santiago de Compostela. "Búfalos son Búfalos". Galería Berini, Barcelona.
 2001: Espacio Caja Burgos, Burgos. - 2000 "...se puede, se puede... se podía". Galería Fúcares, Madrid.
 2002: "ytúúúuuuuqueteeeecreíííííiaselrey/adetoooodoelmuuuundoooooo". Sala Alameda. Provincial Deputation of Málaga. Málaga.
 2004: "Como si no supiera nada de lo que sé que sé". Galería Fúcares; Madrid. Galería Trinta; Santiago de Compostela - 2003 Galería Fúcares Almagro, Ciudad Real.
 2007: "Muchacha con idea clavo". Galería Fúcares, Madrid.
 2008: "Muchacha con idea clavo". Centro cultural CC Bastero Kulturgunea, Guipúzcoa.
 2012: "Millones y abundantes razones". Sala Alcalá 31, Madrid.
 2016: "Por alegrías". Galería Alegría, Madrid.

References

External links

  

1950 births
Living people
20th-century Spanish painters
21st-century Spanish painters
20th-century Spanish women artists
21st-century Spanish women artists
Complutense University of Madrid alumni
Feminist artists
Painters from the Community of Madrid
Spanish contemporary artists
Spanish feminists
Spanish installation artists
Spanish schoolteachers
Spanish women painters
Spanish women photographers
Women installation artists